List of tallest buildings in Azerbaijan. This is the list of all buildings taller than 84 m in Baku, Azerbaijan.

Tallest buildings

Tallest buildings under construction

Tallest proposed buildings

References

External links

Azerbaijan
Buildings
 
Azerbaijan

Tallest